Kirill Igorevich Seleznyov (born 8 December 1985) is a former Russian professional football player.

Club career
He played in the Russian Football National League for FC Volga Ulyanovsk in 2008.

External links
 
 

1985 births
Living people
Russian footballers
Association football forwards
FC Volga Ulyanovsk players